The Soo Thunderbirds are a Junior "A" ice hockey team from Sault Ste. Marie, Ontario, Canada. They are a part of the Northern Ontario Junior Hockey League (NOJHL).

History
Soo Thunderbirds first came into being as a junior hockey program in from 1978 to 1982 through a group started by the late Zoltan Kovacs, Sr. Zoltan, who emigrated to Canada from Hungary in 1956, started the Thunderbirds of the former International Junior B Hockey League to keep more young hockey players at home. Abbie Carricato coached the Thunderbirds during Zoltan's ownership period (1978-1982). The Thunderbirds won three IJHL championships during Zoltan's ownership. The IJHL later folded.

The Soo Thunderbirds announced they would become the Soo Jr. Greyhounds for 2002–03 to establish closer relations with the Ontario Hockey League's Sault Ste. Marie Greyhounds. This only lasted one season and became the Soo Thunderbirds once again.

In 2012, the Thunderbirds won the NOJHL League Championship as well as the coveted Dudley Hewitt Cup. They went on to play at the Royal Bank Cup in Humboldt, Saskatchewan where they lost in the semifinals. The Thunderbirds won NOJHL titles back-to-back in 2014–15 and 2015–16. In 2015, the Thunderbirds would again win the Dudley Hewitt Cup but lose in the finals in 2016.

Following the 2015–16 season and Dudley Hewitt Cup campaign, it was announced that owner, Albert Giommi, had sold the organization to a group called The Tech 921 Ltd., led by former National Hockey League player and Ontario Hockey League coach, Denny Lambert. Following the sale, general manager Jamie Henderson and team president Kevin Cain both resigned. Head coach Jordan Smith was later also assigned the general manager position.

In 2017, the team was struggling financially and the ownership had not committed playing the 2017–18 season. On March 17, local businessman Darren Smyl took over operations of the Thunderbirds in order to keep the team from leaving. However, general manager and head coach Jordan Smith would move on to become the associate coach of the Sudbury Wolves in the Ontario Hockey League. Smith would be replaced by John Parco, a local who played most of his professional career in Europe and had been coaching SG Cortina in Italy. The Thunderbirds also changed rinks and moved into the John Rhodes Community Centre after playing at the Essar Centre. With the ownership change, the Thunderbirds updated to a new color scheme and logo in blue, orange, and white.

In 2021, Smyl sold the team to an ownership composed of former NHL player Trevor Daley, longtime professional player Cole Jarrett, and Lee-Anne Jarrett. Cole took over as head coach of the team and Jamie Henderson was brought back as general manager.

Season-by-season results

Dudley Hewitt Cup
Central Canada Championships
Winners of the NOJHL, OJHL, SIJHL, and Host
Round robin play with 2nd vs 3rd in semi-final to advance against 1st in the finals.

Royal Bank Cup
CANADIAN NATIONAL CHAMPIONSHIPS
Dudley Hewitt Champions - Central, Fred Page Champions - Eastern, Western Canada Cup Champions - Western, Western Canada Cup - Runners Up and Host
Round robin play with top 4 in semi-final and winners to finals.

References

External links
Soo Thunderbirds

Sport in Sault Ste. Marie, Ontario
Northern Ontario Junior Hockey League teams
1999 establishments in Ontario
Ice hockey clubs established in 1999